Who We Are Now is a 2017 American drama film directed and written by Matthew Newton and starring Julianne Nicholson, Emma Roberts, and Zachary Quinto. It screened in the Special Presentations section at the 2017 Toronto International Film Festival.

Premise
One year after being released from prison for manslaughter, a young woman finds herself represented by a bright, young public defense lawyer in an attempt to get custody of her son back.

Cast
 Julianne Nicholson as Beth
 Emma Roberts as Jess
 Zachary Quinto as Peter
 Jimmy Smits as Carl
 Jess Weixler as Gabby
 Lea Thompson as Alana
 Jason Biggs as Vince
 Gloria Reuben as Rebecca
 E.J. Ann as Lu Lin
 Ray Bouderau as Ray in the Salon
 Carly Brooke as Felicity
 Myrna Cabello as Guard
 Katherine Dickson as Actress
 Katie Eichler as Kelly
 Bruce Faulk as Bruce
 Mark C. Fullhardt as Lawyer
 Olli Haaskivi as Kevin
 Samantha Hill as Monica
 Sarah Ito as Nail Salon Patron
 Jo Mei as Mina
 Oscar Pavlo as Man At The Bar
 Torun Esmaeili as Girl At The Bar
 Camila Perez as Maria
 Alexa Petito as School Girl Running Down The Hall / Extra
 Luke Rosen as George
 Sarah Schenkkan as Lisa
 Isreal McKinney Scott as Isreal (Father in Law Firm)
 Shayan Shojaee as Prosecutor
 Logan Smith as Alec
 Grant Shaud as Judge
 Stephanie March as Emma

References

External links
 
 

2017 drama films
2017 films
American drama films
Films directed by Matthew Newton
2010s English-language films
2010s American films